Ardeshir "Adi" Ratan Bulsara (born 15 May 1951) is a scientist in the area nonlinear dynamics. The 2007 International Conference on Applied Nonlinear Dynamics (ICAND), held in Kauai, Hawaii, was a festschrift held in his honor of his 55th birthday.

Honours
In 2004, Bulsara was elected to Fellow of the American Physical Society (APS) for "developing the statistical mechanics of noisy nonlinear dynamical oscillators especially in the theory, application and technology of stochastic resonance detectors." His festschrift in honor of his 55th birthday, which, for logistic reasons, was held when he was 56.

Books by Bulsara
 S. Baglio and A. Bulsara, (editors) Device Applications of Nonlinear Dynamics, Springer-Verlag, Berlin, 2006, 
 A. Bulsara, Noise and Chaos in the RF SQUID, Office of Naval Research, 1992, ASIN B0006R2M5I
 A. Bulsara, Coupled Neural-Dendritic Processes: Cooperative Stochastic Effects and the Analysis of Spike Trains, Office of Naval Research, 1994, ASIN B0006R2O9C
 J. B. Kadtke and A. Bulsara, (editors) Applied Nonlinear Dynamics and Stochastic Systems Near the Millen[n]ium, 411, San Diego, CA, American Institute of Physics, Woodbury, N.Y., 1997,

References

External links
 
 Photo of Bulsara in a high school debate, 1966
 Bulsara's publications at SPAWAR
 Bulsara page
 Humorous tribute to Bulsara
 Article on Bulsara's research
 Reference to Bulsara's work in New Scientist
 Bulsara's Physics Today article
  Reference to Bulsara's thesis
Bulsara's biography at Campion

1951 births
Living people
University of Texas at Austin College of Natural Sciences alumni
People from San Diego
Scientists from Mumbai
Fellows of the American Physical Society
21st-century American physicists
American people of Parsi descent
American Zoroastrians
Probability theorists
Parsi people
Parsi people from Mumbai
Scientists from California